

A soulmate is a person with whom one has a feeling of deep or natural affinity.

Soulmate may also refer to:

Film
 Soul Mates (film), a 1925 silent drama
 Soulmates (film), a 1997 drama film
 Soul Mate (2002 film), a fantasy-comedy film
 Soulmate (2013 film), a horror film
 Soul Mate (2016 film), a Chinese romantic drama film
 Soulmate (2023 film), a South Korean adaptation of the film
 The Soul-Mate, a 2018 Korean drama

Music
 Soulmate (band), a blues band from Shillong, India

Albums
 Soulmate (album), a 2009 album by jacksoul
 Soulmates (Joey Lawrence album), 1997
 Soulmates (Ben Webster album), a 1963 album by Ben Webster with Joe Zawinul
 Soul Mates (album), a jazz album by saxophonists Charlie Rouse and Sahib Shihab

Songs
 "Soulmate" (Natasha Bedingfield song), 2007
 "Soulmate" (Justin Timberlake song), 2018
 "Soulmate", a song by Mac Miller from The Divine Feminine, 2016
 "Soulmate", a song by Lizzo from Cuz I Love You, 2019
 "Soulmate", a song by Wee Papa Girl Rappers, 1998
 "Soul Mate #9", 2001
 "Soul Mates", a song by Grant Nicholas from Yorktown Heights, 2014
 "Soul Mate", a song by Flora Cash, 2021
 "Soulmate", a song by Audio Adrenaline from Don't Censor Me, 1993

Television
 "Soul Mates", a 1994 episode of Babylon 5
 "The Soul Mate", a 1996 episode of Seinfeld
 "Soulmates" (Parks and Recreation), a 2011 episode of Parks and Recreation
 Soul Mates (TV series), a 2014 Australian television comedy series
 Soulmates (TV series), a 2020 American television anthology series

Other uses
 Soulmates (play), a play by David Williamson

See also
 Soul Mates (disambiguation)